Wybrand Willem "Braam" Els  (born 11 November 1971) is a South African former rugby union player.

Playing career

Els played in one test match for the Springboks, as a replacement against   during the 1997 Tri Nations Series at Loftus Versfeld in Pretoria. He also played in two tour matches for the Springboks.

Test history

See also
List of South Africa national rugby union players – Springbok no. 656

References

1971 births
Living people
South African rugby union players
South Africa international rugby union players
Free State Cheetahs players
Falcons (rugby union) players
Rugby union locks
Rugby union players from Gauteng